Tri-Valley Transit (formerly ACTR and Stagecoach) is the public transportation provider primarily serving Addison, Orange, and north Windsor Counties in central Vermont. Tri-Valley Transit's mission is to enhance the economic, social and environmental health of the communities it serves by providing public transportation services that are safe, reliable, accessible and affordable.

TVT became a 501(c)(3) incorporation in 2017 as the unification of Addison County Transit Resources (ACTR) of Addison County, Vermont, and Stagecoach Transportation Inc. (Stagecoach) of Orange and Northern Windsor Counties, Vermont.  Stagecoach was founded in 1976 and ACTR in 1992 by community leaders who recognized that many residents were impeded by a lack of reliable transportation to work, medical appointments and essential errands.

History

In the early days, services focused on elderly residents and were provided by volunteers.  Today TVT offers a robust public Shuttle Bus System for everyone and a complementary Dial-A-Ride System for vulnerable residents who cannot access the Bus System.  Beginning in 2002, ACTR expanded its bus routes and Dial-A-Ride capacity, growing ridership from 68,000 to more than 174,000 in 2019 and its growth necessitated building the Addison County Community Transportation Center in order to meet future community transportation needs.  

Over the past two decades, TVT and ACTR have been recognized more than once nationally as a model rural system and locally for community impact. In 2014, ACTR was named the Chamber of Commerce Non-Profit of the Year, while in 2015, Executive Director Jim Moulton was named the nation’s Community Transportation Manager of the Year, and in 2016, Regional Director Bill Cunningham was named Addison County’s Person of the Year.  In addition, the Community Transportation Center won awards in 2013 and 2017 for innovative green building design.

Based on ACTR’s record of responsible and highly effective community service, the VT Agency of Transportation (VTrans) asked ACTR leadership to enter into a management agreement with Stagecoach in 2014.  Stagecoach was in crisis – facing bankruptcy and potential closure.  During the three-year management agreement with ACTR, Stagecoach’s debt was paid off, it regained its status as the regional Medicaid Non-Emergency Medical trip provider, general public services were expanded, and community impact nearly doubled (from 61,400 rides in 2014 to nearly 112,600 in 2019).  ACTR also benefitted by gaining shared staff, operational efficiencies and cost savings, and a deeper organizational foundation. In 2017, with the management agreement set to expire, the two Boards of Directors recognized the two agencies were stronger together than apart and Tri-Valley Transit was born.  With long histories behind them, however, both divisions continued to operate under their original local branding while slowly building the TVT brand. In 2020, TVT began developing a new, unified logo with plans to implement within 3-6 months.  In 2019, TVT provided more than 268,000 rides and was on track to deliver approximately 300,000 in 2020 before the COVID-19 pandemic.

Services

Dial-A-Ride programs provide more than 119,000 annual rides to elders, persons with disabilities and Medicaid members.  They serve people in more remote towns where Shuttle Buses are not cost efficient.  69 volunteer drivers use their own vehicles to provide rides 7 days-a-week.  TVT volunteers give more than 55,000 work hours annually, an in-kind value of almost $600,000.  While most trips are provided in-county, they also bring passengers to medical specialists across the state and even occasionally as far as Boston or New York City.  In FY19 the Dial-A-Ride System provided 65,500 rides to Medicaid recipients and nearly 83,400 rides to the elderly and disabled.   81% of trips are to medical facilities, 16% to grocery stores or meal sites and 3% elsewhere.  Surveyed riders gave TVT Dial-a-Ride a 98% approval rating. 

Shuttle Bus routes operate 7 days-a-week in densely populated corridors, providing 167,000 rides annually.   Every bus in the fleet is equipped with a wheelchair lift, two built-in child seats, seat belts and bike-carrying racks.  More than half of the respondents to the 2019 bus rider survey reported a household income below poverty level.  They also indicated riding the bus to access work, job training or school (71%), shopping (22%) and medical care (31%).  95% of bus riders say TVT routes get them where they need them to go on time.

Trip planning via TVT is also available on Google Maps.   Bus riders may also access real-time "where's my bus" information with the Transit app on their mobile devices.

Ridership

U.S. Department of Commerce indicates 38% of the region’s population lives below the poverty level, is aged 65 or older or has a disability.  These groups are considered “transit-dependent” because of risk indicators for isolation and poor access to the food and medicine.

Aging Vermonters need more medical care and may become less fit to drive themselves. The region’s elderly population is growing (from 15% in 2000 to a projected 30% in 2030).  Financial pressures create more transit need (VT people living in poverty rose from 9% in 2000 to 11.7% in 2010; and U.S. News & World Report lists Vermonters’ yearly cost of driving at $12,869/year (that’s 23% of VT’s median household income).  

TVT transportation services allow them to reach all the places needed to live a healthy life.  Vermont’s transit-dependent population is growing quickly (from 15% in 2000 to a projected 30% in 2030) and TVT must grow to keep pace with its needs.

References

External links
 Tri-Valley Transit website

Bus transportation in Vermont